The Auditor of Accounts of Delaware is a constitutional officer in the executive branch of the U.S. state of Delaware. The incumbent is Lydia E. York, a Democrat, who was elected to the position in the Nov. 8, 2022 general election and sworn in on Jan. 3, 2023 at Delaware State University. Auditor York was preceded by Dennis Greenhouse, who was appointed to the position by Gov. John Carney after former Auditor of Accounts Kathy McGuiness resigned on October 19, 2022.

Powers and duties
The auditor of accounts provides independent oversight of governments' use of taxpayer dollars through an array of external audits, be it assessments of financial condition, legal compliance, or program performance. The Office of the Auditor of Accounts also investigates fraud, waste, and abuse of public funds and resources and makes special reports on financial issues relevant to state and local government.

References

 
Delaware